The Titusville Commercial District (also known as Downtown Titusville Historic District) is a U.S. historic district in Titusville, Florida. On January 10, 1990, it was added to the U.S. National Register of Historic Places. It is currently debatable whether or not it is Titusville's main commercial district anymore, as an area in south Titusville near the intersection of SR 50 (FL) and State Road 405 (Florida) close to I-95 (FL) has much more major shopping and dining than Downtown Titusville.

References

External links

Brevard County listings at National Register of Historic Places

Buildings and structures in Titusville, Florida
National Register of Historic Places in Brevard County, Florida
Historic districts on the National Register of Historic Places in Florida
Titusville, Florida
1990 establishments in Florida